Paslode is a tool manufacturer. Paslode is an acronym for PAcking Shipping LOading DEvices and was founded in 1935.  The company develops and manufactures nail and staple guns; either powered by proprietary butane cylinders (in combination with battery power) or an external supply of pressurized air. The brand is easily identified by their unique orange and black colouring.

History 

In 1940, Paslode created the first Stapling Hammer. In 1959, the world's first Pneumatic nailer. By 1986, they had created the Impulse range of gas actuated nailing systems, commonly referred to as a nail gun.

In 1986, ITW (Illinois Tool Works) acquired Paslode.

References

External links 
 Paslode (US Site) 
 ITW Construction Products UK

Tool manufacturing companies of the United States
Tool manufacturing companies of the United Kingdom
Manufacturing companies established in 1935